Darío Badillo Ramírez (born 10 December 1959) is a Mexican politician affiliated with the PRI. He currently serves as Deputy of the LXII Legislature of the Mexican Congress representing Hidalgo.

References

1959 births
Living people
Politicians from Hidalgo (state)
Institutional Revolutionary Party politicians
21st-century Mexican politicians
Members of the Congress of Hidalgo
People from Huejutla de Reyes
Deputies of the LXII Legislature of Mexico
Members of the Chamber of Deputies (Mexico) for Hidalgo (state)